John Brasbrigg or Bracebrigge (fl. 1428) was an English book collector, who appears as a priest of Syon Abbey in 1428.

He is said to have given a large number of books to the convent, and to have written a treatise entitled Catholicon continens quatuor partes grammaticæ, which, with other manuscripts belonging to Syon monastery, passed to Corpus Christi College, Cambridge. The name of Brasbrigg is not to be found in James Nasmith's catalogue.

References

Notes 

Year of birth missing
Year of death missing
15th-century English Roman Catholic priests
15th-century English people
English book and manuscript collectors